Americano Futebol Clube, or Americano as they are usually called, is a Brazilian football team from Campos dos Goytacazes in Rio de Janeiro, founded on June 1, 1914.

They play in black and white stripes, black shorts and socks.

History
The club was founded on June 1, 1914 by the Uruguayan Bertoni brothers, after watching a game between America and a Campos combined team, won by 3-1 by the former. The club was originally planned to be named América Football Club, after America of Rio de Janeiro.

In 2002, Americano won both the Taça Guanabara and the Taça Rio, but was defeated by Fluminense in both legs (2-0 and 3-1) of the Campeonato Carioca final. In 2004, Americano reached the final four of the Brazilian Série C, but finished in the third position, after União Barbarense and Gama, and was not promoted to the Série B.

Titles
Taça Guanabara: 1
2002

Taça Rio: 1
2002
Copa Rio: 1
2018
Campeonato Fluminense de Futebol (Former Rio de Janeiro state Football Championship): 5
1964, 1965, 1968, 1969, 1975 

Campeonato da Cidade de Campos (Campos City Championship): 27
1915, 1919, 1921, 1922, 1923, 1925, 1930, 1934, 1935, 1939, 1944, 1946, 1947, 1950, 1954, 1964, 1965, 1967, 1968, 1969, 1970, 1971, 1972, 1973, 1974, 1975, 1977.

 Taça Santos Dumont: 1
2018

 Taça Corcovado: 1
2015

Stadium

Americano's stadium is Estádio Godofredo Cruz, with a maximum capacity of 25,000 people.

Logo and anthem
The nine red stars on Americano's logo represent the nine consecutive Campeonato da Cidade de Campos titles. The golden star represents the 1987, Brazilian Third Division title. The club's official anthem was composed by Pereira Júnior.

References

External links
Official Site

Association football clubs established in 1914
Football clubs in Rio de Janeiro (state)
 
1914 establishments in Brazil